Paranoia Agent is a 2004 Japanese anime television series created by director Satoshi Kon and produced by Madhouse about a social phenomenon in Musashino, Tokyo caused by a juvenile serial assailant named Shonen Bat (Lil' Slugger in the English dub). The series aired on Japan's Wowow from February to May 2004. The English dub aired on Cartoon Network's Adult Swim in the United States from May to August 2005.

Episode list
All episodes were written by Seishi Minakami, except episodes 5 and 10, which were handled by Tomomi Yoshino.

Notes

References

Paranoia Agent
Episodes